Taractichthys is a genus of marine ray-finned fishes from the family Bramidae, the pomfrets.

Species
There are currently two recognized species in this genus:
 Taractichthys longipinnis (R. T. Lowe, 1843) (Big-scale pomfret)
 Taractichthys steindachneri (Döderlein (de), 1883) (Sickle pomfret)

References

 
Bramidae
Perciformes genera
Taxa named by Giles Willis Mead